You Again is a 2010 American comedy film produced by John J. Strauss and Eric Tannenbaum and directed by Andy Fickman with music by Nathan Wang and written by Moe Jelline. The film stars Kristen Bell, Jamie Lee Curtis, Sigourney Weaver, Odette Yustman, James Wolk, Victor Garber, Billy Unger, Kyle Bornheimer, Kristin Chenoweth, and Betty White in her final live-action film acting role before her death in 2021.

The film was released on September 24, 2010, by Touchstone Pictures to negative reviews from critics and it earned $32 million against a production budget of $20 million. It was the last solo Touchstone Pictures project before working on subsequent films in association with Miramax, DreamWorks, Studio Ghibli and Lucasfilm. As a result of this, Touchstone signed a deal with DreamWorks Pictures in 2011, starting with I Am Number Four.

Plot
In 2002, Marni Olsen is an acne-riddled high school sophomore in Ridgefield, California, with glasses and braces, being tormented and bullied by the entire school, specifically senior popular mean girl J.J.. Her protective older brother, Will, was very popular as a handsome basketball player, catching J.J.'s attention, although he for the most part is oblivious to Marni's torment at her hands. At a very important basketball game, J.J. pushes Marni, dressed as the mascot, who runs into Will, resulting in a loss of the game.

Eight years later, in 2010, Marni is a successful public relations executive in Los Angeles, recently promoted to a job in New York. She returns to Ridgefield to celebrate Will's upcoming wedding to fiancée Joanna, an apparently amazing woman.  Having never met Joanna, Marni discovers on the flight back home that Will is about to marry her former bully, J.J. being a nickname that Joanna went by in high school. Marni is upset to see that Joanna not only gets along very well with the family during her welcome home dinner, but apparently doesn’t remember her, delaying the ‘apology’ Marni has been waiting for. Gail, Marni and Will's mother, also discovers that Joanna's beloved aunt, Ramona, a successful and wealthy businesswoman who is also in town for the wedding, is a former high school friend of hers, although their friendship ended on bad terms.

Marni is unwilling to forget the things Joanna did to her in high school unless she apologizes, and tries to let her brother know of Joanna's bullying past. Soon, Marni grows suspicious of Joanna and, after Joanna plays a song she had used to torment Marni in high school, realizes that Joanna does indeed remember her. Marni then remembers that a time capsule buried during her senior year contains a video tape of Joanna acting as a bully, so she decides to uncover the capsule. Meanwhile, Gail comes to Ramona's hotel room for "closure" about anything bad between them that happened in the past. They appear to make up, but Ramona still seems not to be too fond of Gail.

Will and Marni's grandmother Bunny meet Joanna's ex-boyfriend Tim, who appears devastated when he hears that she's marrying Will. Afterwards, at Joanna’s bridal shower, Marni confronts Joanna in the bathroom about her past and Joanna finally relents, admitting that she did remember Marni but instead of apologizing, she threatens Marni to not interfere with her and Will’s relationship. This ultimately convinces Marni that Joanna has not changed and becomes determined to ruin the wedding under the presumption that she’d be ‘protecting’ Will as he had done many times for her. To set a wrench in things, Marni invites Tim as her plus-one to the upcoming rehearsal dinner, hoping his presence there will throw a wrench into things. At the rehearsal dinner, when it is time for guests to make a toast to the bride and groom, an emotional Tim reveals in his toast that Joanna left him at the altar, much to Joanna’s embarrassment and Will’s chagrin. Later, the video recovered from their old high school's time capsule reveals Joanna confessing her true nature as a bully, with footage of her tormenting Marni and other students, including the big basketball game. The footage shocks the guests (including Marni’s family), and Will, confused and upset, leaves the rehearsal dinner, saying he needs to get some air.

Going outside, Marni confronts Joanna once again and the two fight, eventually finding their way inside the rehearsal venue, throwing plates and glasses at each other. While there, Marni claims that Joanna is still the same old bully from high school, backing up her point with the fact that Joanna pretended to forget her, but a remorseful Joanna claims that she only pretended to forget Marni so they could start over. After Marni wrecks one of the wedding gifts in retaliation,  Joanna intentionally dumps a bowl of cold soup on Marni's head.  As this is happening, Will walks in. He scolds both of them for ruining the night before storming out and calling off the wedding, much to Joanna's devastation. Ramona and Gail argue after the rehearsal dinner, and Ramona accuses Gail of trying to ruin her life throughout high school via her popularity, including by stealing her high school crush, Richie Phillips. A fight ensues, with both of them falling into the pool. They revisit the past and make up when Gail's husband, Mark, shows up. At home, he angrily "grounds" Marni and Gail.

Later that night, Marni finds Joanna in the kitchen wearing her wedding dress, crying and binging on junk food. She finally admits to Marni that she feels awful for bullying and tormenting her when they were in high school. Joanna tells Marni that she turned over a new leaf after the death of her parents, hoping to be the kind of person that they could be proud of. Joanna also says that she pretended not to know Marni because she was afraid that the revelation of her bullying past would lead to her losing Will and his family, saying that she loves them all, and that they made her feel like she had a family again. Marni finally forgives her and promises to get them back together. Marni apologizes to Will for her actions as well, admitting that she was only trying to protect him from what she thought Joanna had been.

Joanna and Will reconcile in the family's old tree house, but Will and Marni’s younger brother Ben reveals that he loosened the screws so as to avoid having Will and Joanna take it away, and as a result, the treehouse collapses and injures the couple. They are both forced to stay at a hospital, which delays the wedding. However, Marni puts together a makeshift wedding at the hospital. Gail surprises Ramona with Richie Phillips, and the two seemingly start a relationship with each other. Meanwhile, Marni appears to start a relationship with Charlie, her brother's best friend and the only person besides her brother who was ever nice to her back in high school. Joanna introduces Bunny to an elderly woman, Helen. Helen and Bunny are revealed to have been rivals in high school. Bunny finally gets her revenge when she cuts in on Helen's dance and takes her partner, while Helen swears that the game is not yet over.

Cast

Music

 "We Are the Champions" – Performed by Queen
 "Barracuda" – Performed by Heart
 "I'll Go On" – Performed by Brittany Burton
 "Kiss on My List" – Performed by Hall & Oates
 "Full of U" – Performed by Shaun Ruymen
 "Pump It" – Performed by The Black Eyed Peas
 "Bounce with Me" – Performed by Kreesha Turner
 "Kiss Me" – Performed by Sixpence None the Richer
 "Toxic" – Performed by Britney Spears
 "What Is Love" – Written and Performed by Jackie Tohn
 "Magic of Maui" – Written and Performed by Charles Brotman and Elmer Lim Jr.
 "By the Time You Forget" – Written and Performed by Andy Suzuki
 "Paris Without You" – Performed by Perry Danos
 "Dinner 4 Deux" – Written and Performed by Charles Blaker and Kevin Hiatt
 "Jump" – Performed by Ali Dee and the Deekompressors
 "Every Woman in the World" – Written by Dominic Bugatti and Frank Musker
 "We Are Family" – Performed by Chic featuring Nile Rodgers
 "Who's Sorry Now?" – Performed by Connie Francis

Production
You Again was completed on April 3, 2010. The rivalry between the two grandmothers, Betty White and Cloris Leachman, is a reference to the conflict between the two on The Mary Tyler Moore Show. Three of the cast members from the sitcom Step by Step (Patrick Duffy, Staci Keanan, and Christine Lakin) appeared in the movie in a "mini-reunion".

Reception

Critical response

Rotten Tomatoes gives You Again an approval rating of 19% based on reviews from 96 critics, with an average score of 4.00/10. The critical consensus reads: "You Again represents a rare opportunity to see some of Hollywood's finest female veterans together onscreen - and, unfortunately, wastes their talents almost completely." On Metacritic, it had a weighted average score of 28 out of 100,  based on  25 critics, indicating "generally unfavorable reviews". Audiences polled by CinemaScore gave the film an average grade of "B+" on an A+ to F scale.

Jamie Lee Curtis and Kristen Bell were praised for their roles. The New York Times critic Stephen Holden wrote that "There is not a laugh to be found in this rancid, misogynistic revenge comedy," declaring "Like so many Disney movies, 'You Again' exalts shallow, materialistic values, then tries to camouflage its essentially poisonous content with several layers of sugar coating and weepy reconciliation." Richard Roeper gave the film an F and stated that it was one of the worst movies he'd ever seen. Among the more favorable reviews was Lana Berkowitz of The San Francisco Chronicle, who wrote that she enjoyed the mix of slapstick, musical numbers and surprise cameo appearances. Bill Goodykoontz of The Arizona Republic praised the cast for taking "a by-the-numbers comedy" and making it better than it has any right to be.

Box office
The film opened at the box office at  5 with $8,407,513 and would go on to gross a domestic total of $25,702,053; with an international gross of $6,303,195, You Again grossed $32,005,248 worldwide; against a $20 million production budget.

Accolades
Women Film Critics Circle Awards 2010

Young Artist Awards 2011

Home media
The film was released by Touchstone Home Entertainment in a two-disc Blu-ray and DVD combo pack on February 8, 2011. Bonus features include deleted scenes, bloopers, and a question-and-answer (Q&A) feature entitled Ask the Cast.

References

External links

 
 
 
 
 
 

2010 films
2010 comedy films
American comedy films
Films about bullying
Films about siblings
Films about weddings
Films directed by Andy Fickman
Films produced by Andy Fickman
Films scored by Nathan Wang
Films set in 2002
Films set in 2010
Films set in California
Films set in New York (state)
Films shot in Los Angeles
Touchstone Pictures films
2010s English-language films
2010s American films